German utopian communities are historic intentional communities that were formed in wake of various social movements from the mid 19th-century until the 1930s. Estimates show that around 100 communities were created between 1918 and 1933, but data is unreliable. Although communities were ideologically diverse, they shared a common sense of mission in their exemplary function for German society at large.

Background
Rural life has been romanticized since antiquity, for example in concepts such as  Arcadia or the biblical Garden of Eden.

Due to technological, medical and agricultural advances, the population of the European continent doubled during the 19th century, from approximately 200 million to more than 400 million. Approximately 70 million people emigrated from Europe, with most migrating to the United States. The countries also  urbanized with numerous cities worldwide surpassing populations of a million or more during this century. 
Early in the century, various land reform ideas were expressed first by individual socio-eonomists like Friedrich Engels to relieve urban poverty. The Prussian and later German government designed official land reform programmes under the name of interior colonization, through which barren and infertile land (in the east) could be transformed into homesteads for the urban poor.

Map

List

Interpretations 
Bernd Wedemeyer-Kolwe describes four lines of interpretation which roughly follow and build on each other chronologically.

Early scholarship from the 1960s onwards saw reform movements as ersatz religion and compensation of the bourgeois middle class, which was loosing political influence between growing capitalist magnates and under pressure from a rising working class. Settlements, then, were a romantic-utopian escapism from mass industrialization into the personal and individual.

Building on this, researchers of the 1970s and 1980s increasingly saw aspects of socio-political protest incorporated into the allegedly private reform movements. This bourgeois-anti-bourgeois paradox was extensively examined in scholarship from then on and later became seen as an essential character of modernism, because "modernity stands in its essence continually in opposition to itself".

Finally, a majority of contemporary scholars now view the reform movements not as escape from or protest against modernity, but instead its very forerunners.  Wedemeyer-Kolwe points out that this also adequately reflects the self-perception of those people involved in the 19th century reform movements, who thought themselves "rational, modern and progressive".

According to another fringe interpretation presented by Barlösius and Wedemeyer-Kolwe, the reform movements allowed members of a newly developing middle class to assimilated themselves into and absorb the former bourgeois lifestyle and values, which became the new mainstream in the early 20th century. Eisenberg also observed this in the history of association football.

There has been no updated overview on the settlement aspect of German 19th century reform movements in particular since the handbook of 1998. Furthermore, "interpretations of the historic phenomenon in its global context are still missing".

Influence 
When alternative movements became popular again in the 1960s they were seemingly unaware of their ancestral roots. Researchers with biographic backgrounds in the new movements, especially those involved in the protests of 1968, then revived interest in the topic.

The change of millennia brought another wave of interest in sustainability due to widespread fears of ecological collapse.

See also 
 List of intentional communities § Germany
 List of Finnish utopian communities
 List of American utopian communities
 Global Ecovillage Network
 Intentional Community
 German Youth Movement
 Garden City Movement
 Lebensreform
 back-to-the-land movement
 Tolstoyan movement
 Land reform in Prussia
 Ecovillage
 Agrarianism
 Homesteading

References

Further reading
 
 
 
 
 
 
 
 

Society of Germany
German
Germany-related lists